Combitech can refer to following companies:
Combitech AB
Combitech Traffic Systems AB